Filippovsky is a rural locality (a settlement) and the administrative center of Filippovsky Selsoviet, Kamensky District, Altai Krai, Russia. The population was 315 as of 2013. There are 4 streets.

Geography 
Filippovsky is located 55 km southwest of Kamen-na-Obi (the district's administrative centre) by road. Zelyonaya Dubrava is the nearest rural locality.

References 

Rural localities in Kamensky District, Altai Krai